The 2015 Minnesota Swarm season is the eleventh and final season of the Minnesota Swarm, a lacrosse team based in Saint Paul, Minnesota playing in the National Lacrosse League. Beginning in 2016 the Swarm will relocate to Duluth, Georgia and become the Georgia Swarm.

Regular season

Current standings

Game log

Roster

Transactions

Trades

Entry Draft
The 2014 NLL Entry Draft took place on September 22, 2014. The Swarm made the following selections:

See also
2015 NLL season

References

Minnesota Swarm seasons
Minnesota Swarm
Minnesota Swarm